Sylvie di Giusto is a New York-based based Austrian professional Speaker, Consultant and Author.

Early life
Di Giusto was born in Austria and grew up in a multicultural family (French, Italian, Austrian). She now lives in New York City with her two children and her husband.

She graduated from Paedagogische Hochschule Wien (Vienna, Austria) and subsequently started a career as a teacher for Communications and Information Technology. She spent the first years of her career teaching young students and adults at Bundeshandelsakademie Wien 10 and Bundeshandelsakademie Wien 13.

Career
As a trainer and consultant, Sylvie di Giusto has worked for companies like BMW, BASF, Henkel, and McKinsey. She has been one of the first German e-Learning pioneers developing e-Learning programs and learning management systems, offering corporate clients the chance to implement online learning into their training and development curriculum. She joined Karstadt Warenhaus AG in 2001 (training and development for retail company) and quickly took over a group-wide responsibility at Karstadt Quelle New Media where she developed hybrid learning solutions for the entire KarstadtQuelle group.

Di Giusto joined the Management Consulting Team at Karstadt Quelle AG (later Arcandor AG) to build and lead the Arcandor Academy, an innovative Management Academy for the Top Leaders and Global Talents. Her management development programs were offered to more than 100,000 employees including those of retail company Karstadt Warenhaus AG (based in Essen), its flag store KaDeWe (based in Berlin), Alsterhaus (based in Hamburg) Thomas Cook (Tourism company, based in Peterborough, UK), Quelle AG (based in Nuernberg), Neckermann AG (based in Frankfurt) and several small mail order companies around the world.

In 2011, she moved to the United States and became a corporate Image Consultant, specializing in Personal Branding and focusing on corporations, professionals and politicians.

Today she is a professional Keynote Speaker and speaks about the power and impact of first impressions of employees and leaders in organizations, their impact on the customer’s decision making process and the company’s reputation. In her keynotes she reveals the components of a professional and personal brand, which she describes as the sum total of appearance, behavior, communication and digital footprint. She has spoken for companies such as American Airlines, American Express, Bloomberg, Exelon, Fashion Institute of Technology, Grant Thornton, Nespresso, Nickelodeon, Manulife, Merial, Prudential, Waldorf Astoria ,and Harvard Business Club, Hofstra University, Pand enn University.

Currently, she is the President (Owner) of Executive Image Consulting LLC based in New York City, and Co-Owner of Studio for Image Professionals where she teaches and certifies Students who want to start and pursue a career as an Image Consultant.

She is the author of "The Image of Leadership: How Leaders Package Themselves to Stand Out for the Right Reasons," which is part of the C-Suite Book Club, a part of The C-Suite Network.

Publications
Books authored by Sylvie di Giusto:
 The Image of Leadership, How Leaders package themselves to stand out for the right reasons

Media
 CNBC Article - 3 Things you can Learn from Mark Zuckerberg and Bill Gates About Making a Good First Impression 

 CNBC Article - How to Impress Your Boss in 7 Seconds 

 CNN Money Article - How a woman’s appearance affects her career 

 Business Insider Germany Feature 

 C-Suite TV Best Seller TV Interview 

 The Steve Show with Steven Napolitan Interview

References

External links
 Company website 
 Book website 
 Studio website

Austrian women writers
Living people
Year of birth missing (living people)